The 2014–15 Copa Catalunya is the 26th staging of the Copa Catalunya. The competition began on 2 and 3 August 2014 and was played by teams in Segunda División, Segunda División B, Tercera División and the top teams of Primera Catalana. Teams of lower divisions played a new competition called Copa Catalunya Amateur. FC Barcelona and RCD Espanyol joined the competition with their reserve teams.

Girona, Sabadell and Barcelona B, who played in the 2013–14 Segunda División joined the competition in the fourth round.

Tournament

First round
The first round was drawn on July 4, 2014.

Bye: Llagostera

Second round
Bye: Cerdanyola del Vallès

Third round

Quarterfinals
Bye: Gavà

Semifinals
The semifinals were drawn on 2 December 2014 and will be played on 4 February 2015.

Final

References

External links
Federació Catalana de Futbol 

Cata
Copa Catalunya seasons
Copa